Hendrik Douwe Kloosterman (9 April 1900 – 6 May 1968) was a Dutch mathematician, known for his work in number theory (in particular, for introducing Kloosterman sums) and in representation theory.

After completing his master's degree at Leiden University from 1918–1922 he studied at the University of Copenhagen with Harald Bohr and the University of Oxford with G. H. Hardy. In 1924 he received his Ph.D. in Leiden under supervision of J. C. Kluyver. From 1926 to 1928 he studied at the universities of Göttingen and Hamburg, and he was assistant at the University of Münster from 1928-1930. Kloosterman was appointed lector (associate professorship) at  Leiden University in 1930 and full professor in 1947. In 1950 he was elected a member of the Royal Netherlands Academy of Arts and Sciences.

References

External links
 

1900 births
1968 deaths
20th-century Dutch mathematicians
Leiden University alumni
Academic staff of Leiden University
Members of the Royal Netherlands Academy of Arts and Sciences
Number theorists
People from Smallingerland